Estrela is a toy manufacturer in Brazil.  The company was founded in São Paulo in 1937, when it started producing dolls and wooden toy cars.   In 1944 it became a publicly traded corporation.  As of  2005, Carlos Tilkian is CEO of the company.

Its symbol is a four-pointed star, a sort of compass, referring to the company name "Estrela" which means "star" in Portuguese.

The company has over four hundred products in their line and three factories in Brazil.

It has its shares listed on B3 under the share codes ESTR4 and ESTR3.

See also
Ferrorama

References

External links 
  

Toy companies of Brazil
Manufacturing companies based in São Paulo
Companies listed on B3 (stock exchange)
Manufacturing companies established in 1937
Brazilian brands
1937 establishments in Brazil